Josephine Serrano Collier (March 14, 1922 – February 25, 2014) was the first Latina woman to join the Los Angeles Police Department.

Early life 
Collier grew up in Lincoln Heights, Los Angeles.

Career 
Collier worked for the Lockeed Corporation building P-38 Ventura fighter planes during World War II.

In 1946, she was one of nine women to be hired by the Los Angeles Police Department. Of these nine women, Collier was the only one of Mexican descent making her the first Latina woman to join the Los Angeles Police Department.

Collier retired from the Los Angeles Police Department in 1960.

Personal life 
Collier married fellow officer, Darwin "Jack" Collier. The couple, who had three children, moved to Idaho and later to Arizona where Collier died at the age of 91.

References 

People from Lincoln Heights, Los Angeles
2014 deaths
American women police officers
Los Angeles Police Department officers
21st-century American women
1922 births